Murri is a demonym for Aboriginal Australians of modern-day Queensland and north-western New South Wales. For some people and organisations, the use of Indigenous language regional terms is an expression of pride in their heritage. The term includes many ethno-linguistic groups within the area, such as the Kamilaroi (Gamilaraay) and Yuggera (Jagera) peoples.

Many Murri people play rugby league, and the annual Murri Rugby League Carnival is a big event in the sporting calendar.

History 
Many Murri were forcibly removed from their land, and placed on missions and Aboriginal reserves with other tribes with whom their relations may not have been friendly. From 1900 until 1972, a substantial number of Murri children became part of the Stolen Generations.

Along with all Australian Aboriginal people they were given suffrage in 1962 for federal elections, along with free access to Musgrave Park. They now own and operate the Murri radio network.

Ethno-linguistic groups
Many of the Murri peoples spoke languages of the Mari family, which was named after the Murri people, but ethnicity and language classifications do not correspond completely. Specific ethno-linguistic groups include:

 Butchulla (Batjala)
 Baruŋgam
 Bayali
 Birri Gubba (Birigaba, Biria)
 Bundjalung
 (see also Yugambeh-Bandjalangic peoples)
 Darumbal
 Djabugay
 Dyirbal (Jirrbal)
 Gangulu
 Goreng Goreng
 Gubbi Gubbi
 Guwinmal (Koinjmal)
 Jandai
 Kamilaroi (Gamilaraay)
 Mamu
 Turrbul
 Wakka Wakka
 Wangaibon
 Weilwan (Wayilwan)
 Wik peoples such as the Wik Munkin
 Yuggera (Jagera)

Murri Courts

Murri Courts,  a type of specialist community court for sentencing Aboriginal and Torres Strait Islander people in Queensland, were established in August 2002. After being closed down by the government in September 2012 as a cost-cutting exercise, they were reopened in April 2016 under the new Palaszczuk government. in April 2016.

Sport
Since 2011, the annual Murri Rugby League Carnival has been held with the support of the Arthur Beetson Foundation and the Deadly Choices organisation. Through the four-day Carnival, players are selected to represent the Queensland Murri Rugby League team to participate against touring teams in Australia or other countries.

Terminology
For some people and organisations, the use of indigenous language regional terms is an expression of pride in their heritage. There are a number of other demonyms, or names from Australian Aboriginal languages commonly used to identify groups based on geography:
 Anangu in northern South Australia, and neighbouring parts of Western Australia and Northern Territory
 Pama in northern Queensland
 Koori in New South Wales and Victoria
 Nunga in southern South Australia
 Nyoongar in southern Western Australia
 Palawah (or Pallawah) in Tasmania
 Wangai in central Western Australia
 Yamatji in the Gasgoyne and Pilbara regions of Western Australia
 Yolngu in Arnhem Land, Northern Territory

Notable Murri people

 Ben Barba, rugby league footballer
 Matt Bowen, rugby league footballer
 Kev Carmody, singer/songwriter
 Wesley Enoch, playwright and artistic director
 Dane Gagai, rugby leaguefootballer
 Justin Hodges, rugby league footballer
 Robert Lui, rugby league footballer
 Chris Sandow, rugby league footballer
 Johnathan Thurston, rugby league footballer
 Travis Waddell, rugby league footballer

See also
 Indigenous Collection (Miles District Historical Village)

Notes

Citations

Sources

]-->

Aboriginal peoples of New South Wales
Aboriginal peoples of Queensland